Peter Delaney (born 9 September 1941) is a New Zealand rower.

Delaney was born in 1941 in Wellington, New Zealand. He represented New Zealand at the 1964 Summer Olympics. He is listed as New Zealand Olympian athlete number 170 by the New Zealand Olympic Committee.

References

1941 births
Living people
New Zealand male rowers
Rowers at the 1964 Summer Olympics
Olympic rowers of New Zealand